Mimolette is a cheese traditionally produced around the city of Lille, France. In France it is also known as Boule de Lille after its city of origin, or vieux Hollande because it was originally inspired by the Dutch Edam cheese.

Description
Mimolette has a spherical shape and is similar in appearance to a cantaloupe melon. It normally weighs about 2 kg (approximately 4.5 pounds) and is made from cow's milk. Its name comes from the French word mi-mou (feminine mi-molle), meaning "semi-soft", which refers to the oily texture of this otherwise hard cheese. The bright orange color of the cheese comes from the natural seasoning, annatto. When used in small amounts, primarily as a food colorant, annatto adds no discernible flavor or aroma. The grey-colored rind of aged Mimolette occurs from cheese mites that are added to the surface of the cheese, which serve to enhance its flavor.

Mimolette can be consumed at different stages of aging. When younger, its taste resembles that of Parmesan. Many appreciate it most when it is "extra-old" (extra-vieille). At that point, it can become rather hard to chew, and the flesh takes on a hazelnut-like flavor.

History
It was originally made by the request of Louis XIV, who – in the context of Jean-Baptiste Colbert's mercantilistic policies – was looking for a native French product to replace the then very popular Edam. To make it distinct from Edam, it was first colored using carrot juice and later seasoned with annatto to give it a distinct orange color.

The cheese was known to be a favorite of French President Charles de Gaulle.

Health concerns in the U.S.
In 2013, the Food and Drug Administration detained about a ton of the cheese, putting further imports to the United States on hold. This was because the cheese mites could cause an allergic reaction if consumed in large quantities. The FDA stated that the cheese was above the standard of six mites per cubic inch.

See also
Milbenkäse
Casu marzu
 List of cheeses

References 

French cheeses
Cow's-milk cheeses
Mites as food
Lille